Joe the Barbarian is an eight-issue comic book limited series written by Grant Morrison and drawn by Sean Murphy. It was published in 2010-2011 by Vertigo Comics.

Morrison has discussed the inspiration behind the series:

The first issue was released in January 2010 (cover dated March 2010).

Plot summary
Joe is a teenage boy with Type 1 diabetes. When his blood sugar drops and he enters a state of hypoglycemia, he begins to hallucinate, and enters a fantasy world populated with his toys and other fantasy characters. Here he becomes embroiled in a war with King Death, while in the real world he searches for a soda to fix his blood sugar. He knows there is one in the kitchen downstairs, but it is extremely far away, made farther by his medical condition affecting his mobility.

Collected editions
The series was collected into a single volume:
 Joe the Barbarian (224 pages, DC Deluxe Edition hardcover, September 2011)

Reception
The first issue had estimated sales of 25,543, placing it at number 77 in the American comics market sales rankings. The second issue had 17,512 estimated sales and slipped to 97th in the sales lists, after which sales then stabilised with issue three estimated to have sold 17,674 (119 in the rankings) 17,102 for issue #4 (108 in the rankings) 16,725 with #5 (118 in the rankings) and 16,219 with #6 (118 in the rankings).

Adaptation  
The comic has been optioned for a film adaptation by Thunder Road Pictures.

Notes

References

External links
Joe the Barbarian on the Graphic Content blog, DC Comics.com

Reviews

Review: Joe the Barbarian #1, Comic Book Resources
Sunday Slugfest: Joe the Barbarian #1 Review, Comics Bulletin
Joe the Barbarian #1 Review, IGN
Joe the Barbarian #1 -- Hot Ink Advance Review, Comics Alliance
Joe the Barbarian #1 Review, Comics Should Be Good!, Comic Book Resources
Joe the Barbarian #2 Review, Comics Bulletin
Joe the Barbarian #2 Review, IGN
Joe the Barbarian #2 Review, Comics Should Be Good!, Comic Book Resources
Joe the Barbarian #3 Review, Comics Bulletin
Joe the Barbarian #4 Review, Comics Bulletin

Comics by Sean Murphy